Vindafjorden ( or Vinda Fjord) is a fjord in Rogaland county, Norway. The fjord marks the municipal boundaries between Vindafjord, Suldal, and Tysvær. The fjord initially runs from the very narrow Ropeid isthmus to the west and near the village of Vikadal, the fjord heads to the south before emptying into the Boknafjorden near the village of Nedstrand. There are two smaller fjords which branch off of the Vindafjorden. They are the Sandeidfjorden (to the north) and the Yrkjefjorden (to the west).

See also
 List of Norwegian fjords

References

Fjords of Rogaland
Suldal
Vindafjord
Tysvær